Pentastiridius is a genus of true bugs belonging to the family Cixiidae.

The genus has almost cosmopolitan distribution.

Species:
 Pentastiridius apicalis (Uhler, 1896) 
 Pentastiridius badiensis Van Stalle, 1986

References

Cixiidae